Quadrangle Development Corporation is a privately held, vertically integrated real estate development company based in Washington, D.C., in the United States. By 2002, it was one of the largest real estate developers in the Washington, D.C., metropolitan area. As of April 2011, the company owned 83 properties (consisting of apartment buildings, condominiums, hotels, and office buildings) totaling  and worth $8.4 billion.

History
Quadrangle Development Corporation was founded in 1971 by Robert Gladstone and James R. Crozier. The company originally focused on constructing apartment complexes, but after a few years began erecting office buildings and hotels.

Among the many projects which Quadrangle Development Corporation has been involved in are:
The JW Marriott Hotel Washington in 1979.
The Shops at National Place and the National Theatre, which were part of the redevelopment of Pennsylvania Avenue NW in the late 1970s and the early 1980s.
The Grand Hyatt Washington in 1987.
The Washington Center Office office building at 1001 G Street NW in 1989.
Hyatt Regency Chesapeake Bay Golf Resort, Spa & Marina near Annapolis, Maryland, in 2001. This site includes the River Marsh Golf Course.
MedImmune Inc. headquarters in Gaithersburg, Maryland, in 2003.
The Hilton Baltimore in 2008.
Towers Crescent mixed-use development at Tysons Corner, Virginia, in 2009.
Mount Vernon Place, a mixed-use development at Mount Vernon Triangle in Washington, D.C. (under construction as of October 2012).
Washington Marriott Marquis, an 1,175-room "headquarters hotel" next to the Walter E. Washington Convention Center in Washington, D.C. (Opened May 1, 2014).

In December 2014, Chairman Robert Gladstone died at his home in Washington, D.C.

References

External links
Quadrangle Development Corporation official Web site

Privately held companies based in Washington, D.C.
1971 establishments in Washington, D.C.
1971 establishments in the United States
Real estate companies established in 1971
Real estate companies of the United States
Commercial real estate companies
Private equity portfolio companies